The Philippine Sports Hall of Fame (PSHOF) is a hall of fame established in 1999 to honor Filipino athletes, trainers, and coaches with the first batch of inductees included in the hall of fame in 2010.

The Philippine Sports Commission manages the operations of the hall of fame.

Background
The Philippine Sports Hall of Fame was established through legislation, particularly Republic Act No. 8757 which was signed into law by then-President Joseph Estrada on November 25, 1999 to "immortalize the Filipino Sports heritage" which were meant to serve as an inspiration to Filipinos.

Eligibility
By law, those eligible to be inducted to the Philippine Sports Hall of Fame must be Filipino athletes, coaches and trainers must satisfy at least one of these criteria:
Won a gold medal in any Southeast Asian Games.
Won at least a silver in the Asian Games, or any Asia-level or regional games.
Bronze medalist in any Olympic Games or world-level competitions.
World champion in any professional or amateur sports competition.

Induction ceremonies

Inductees

2010

2016

2018

2021

References

All-sports halls of fame
Halls of fame in the Philippines
1999 establishments in the Philippines